Carlos Echevarría is a film and television actor, producer, and writer.

He works in the cinema of Argentina.

Filmography
Olympic Garage (1999)
Vamos ganando (2001)
Sons and Daughters (2001)
Los Inquilinos del infierno (2004)
Vacaciones día uno (2004)
Ciudad para vivir (2005)
Como un avión estrellado (2005)
A Year Without Love (2005)
Stephanie (2005)
Otros besos brujos (2006)
Un Grito de Corazón (2006)
Celo (2006)
Impunidad (2007)
Lo siniestro (2008)
Desbordar (2009)
Hoy la turbulencia del ayer (2009)
Absent (Ausente) (2010)
Armonias del Caos (2011)
Absence (2011)
Solo (2013)
The Third One (2014)

Television
Archivo negro (1997) (mini TV Series)
1000 millones (2002) TV Series a.k.a. Love Heritage
Juego de opuestos: Las reglas de la conquista (2003) (mini TV Series)

References

External links

Argentine male film actors
Year of birth missing (living people)
Living people
Place of birth missing (living people)